Nyunt Phay (born 1961) is the current Union Minister for Education of Myanmar. He was appointed by the State Administration Council after the 2021 coup. He previously served as the Rector of Pathein University and was asked by the President's Office for clarification due to financial scandals at the university.

Financial issues 
When an order was issued to transfer Rector of  Pathein University to Director General of the Department of Monitoring  and Evaluation (Education) in Nay Pyi Taw without the authority of the Rector, he quickly signed a contract with a company to build new old staff quarters at Pathein University. He also had problems with university finances.

References 

Government ministers of Myanmar
Education ministers
Education ministers of Myanmar
Living people
1961 births